Gaston Egmond Thorn (3 September 192826 August 2007) was a Luxembourg politician who served in a number of high-profile positions, both domestically and internationally. Amongst the posts that he held were the 19th Prime Minister of Luxembourg (1974–1979), President of the United Nations General Assembly (1975), and the seventh President of the European Commission (1981–1985).

Life and career
Thorn was born in Luxembourg City. His early childhood however was spent in Strasbourg where his father worked for the French railways. At the outbreak of World War II the family returned to Luxembourg. While still at school he engaged in resistance activities during the German occupation, and spent several months in prison. After the war he initially studied medicine in Montpellier, then switched to law, and continued his studies in Lausanne and Paris, and practised law in Luxembourg from 1955. In 1957 he married Liliane Petit, a journalist. He entered politics in 1959, representing the liberal Democratic Party. He was a member of the European Parliament from 1959 to 1969. He was Chairman of the Democratic Party from 1962 to 1969. From 1961 to 1963 he was one of the aldermen of the City of Luxembourg.

Thorn was Foreign Minister and Foreign Trade Minister of Luxembourg from 1969 to 1980, Prime Minister from 1974 to 1979 and Minister of Economics from 1977 to 1980. He was also President of the United Nations General Assembly from 1975 to 1976 for its 30th session.

As Prime Minister from 1974–1979 he presided over a socialist-liberal coalition, between his own Democratic Party and the Luxembourg Socialist Workers' Party. This was the first Luxembourg government since World War II that did not involve the dominant Christian Social People's Party (CSV), and similarly, he was the first non-CSV prime minister since the war. He was the head of government even though his party had fewer seats in the legislature than their coalition partner.

European Commission 

In 1980 Thorn was chosen as President of the Commission of the European Communities (now called the European Union), in succession to Roy Jenkins. He took office on 12 January 1981. France and Britain had been against his appointment as Commission President, whereas his candidature was supported by the smaller countries and by West Germany, this because of Luxembourg's involvement in building up the Commission.

His presidency was marked by several difficulties. It coincided with a time of economic and political crisis, of Eurosclerosis, inside the European Community. Relations between the Commission and British government under Margaret Thatcher declined, over her demands that Britain should be compensated by other countries for its share of payments towards the Commission budget. There was also tension due to other EC governments' reservations about Britain's role in the Falklands War; and due to some European leaders' opposition to United States foreign policy and the deployment of cruise missiles and Pershing missiles in Europe. This was in addition to the long-running international recession, and occasional threats of trade wars. This all "combined to put the aspirations of Thorn and other supporters of European integration on hold". However, as EC President, Thorn did manage to reach agreement on a common fisheries policy, and laid the basis for Portugal and Spain joining the European Community. Greece had just joined when his mandate started in 1981.

Although Thorn was not considered a very forceful Commission President, during his term of office the Commission continued to expand its power, both at the expense of the national governments of EC members, and of the European Parliament, with which the Commission engaged in a constant power struggle. In this Thorn laid the groundwork for his successor Jacques Delors, who took the Commission to the height of its power.

Post-Presidency 
After leaving the Commission Presidency in 1985, Thorn went into business. He was chairman of Luxembourg's largest media company CLT, and president of the Banque Internationale à Luxembourg from 1985 to 1999.

Thorn remained active in international and political affairs, as President of the International European Movement and as a member of the Trilateral Commission, the Bilderberg conference and of the Jean Monnet Committee.  He was also president of the Liberal International.  He was married to Liliane Thorn-Petit (1933-2008), a journalist, with whom he had one son.

Honours 
 Grand Cross of the Order of Adolphe of Nassau
 Grand Cross of the Pian Order
 Grand Cross of the Legion of Honour
 Honorary Knight Grand Cross of the Royal Victorian Order
 Honorary Knight Grand Cross of the Order of St Michael and St George

See also 
 List of prime ministers of Luxembourg
 Thorn Ministry
 Werner-Thorn Ministry

Further reading
Obituary, The Daily Telegraph, 28 August 2007

References 

|-

|-

|-

|-

|-

|-

|-

|-

|-

|-

1928 births
2007 deaths
Prime Ministers of Luxembourg
Presidents of the European Commission
Luxembourgian European Commissioners
Presidents of the United Nations General Assembly
Presidents of the Liberal International
Ministers for Foreign Affairs of Luxembourg
Ministers for the Economy of Luxembourg
Deputy Prime Ministers of Luxembourg
Ministers for Justice of Luxembourg
Democratic Party (Luxembourg) politicians
20th-century Luxembourgian lawyers
People from Luxembourg City
Permanent Representatives of Luxembourg to the United Nations
Honorary Knights Grand Cross of the Order of St Michael and St George
Luxembourgian bankers
European Commissioners 1981–1985